Canne mozze ("Sawed-off Shotgun") is a 1977 Italian crime-thriller film written and directed by Mario Imperoli. It was the last film directed by Imperoli, who died in December 1977.

Plot 

A Mafia killer returns to his village in Sicily to avenge the death of his brother, who was killed by one of the members of a rival clan. To do this he escapes from prison, and then finds refuge in a villa, where he is forced to kidnap the couple living in the house.

Cast 

 Antonio Sabàto: Giovanni Molé
 Ritza Brown: Silvia 
 John Richardson: Michele
 Attilio Dottesio: Don Carrara

See also   
 List of Italian films of 1977

References

External links

1970s Italian-language films
Poliziotteschi films
1970s crime thriller films
Films directed by Mario Imperoli
Films scored by Manuel De Sica
Films set in Sicily
Films about the Sicilian Mafia
1970s Italian films